The National Association of Flight Instructors (NAFI) is a United States professional organisation for flight instructors. Founded in 1967 by Jack Eggspuehler (professor of aviation at Ohio State University Airport at the time) NAFI is dedicated exclusively to "raising and maintaining the professional standing of the flight instructor in the aviation community". NAFI was affiliated with the Experimental Aircraft Association (EAA) from 1995 until 2010. NAFI is governed by a board of directors composed of eleven members. The organisation works with other groups such as AOPA, EAA, and the Federal Aviation Administration. Robert Meder is the organization's current chairman. 

In 1997, NAFI completed development of its prestigious Master CFI, program. The first person designated by NAFI as a Master CFI was Greg Brown, a well known flight instructor, aviation author, and AOPA Pilot magazine editor. Since then, NAFI has expanded the program to include ground instructors as well as flight instructors. In June, 2009, an updated version of the program was approved by the FAA. Master instructor accreditation is valid for two years.

References

External links
 National Association of Flight Instructors - Official Website
 BY-LAWS OF THE NATIONAL ASSOCIATION OF FLIGHT INSTRUCTORS  - BY-LAWS

Flight training
1967 establishments in the United States
Organizations established in 1967